Felicia of Roucy ( – 3 May 1123) was a queen consort of Aragon and Navarre. She was a daughter of Hilduin IV of Montdidier, and his wife Alice of Roucy. They were Picards.

Felicia was married in 1076 to Sancho Ramírez, then king of Aragon after he had divorced his first wife, Isabella of Urgell. His accession to the crown of Navarre later that year made her the first Aragonese consort to be also Queen consort of Navarre. She is attested shortly before her husband's death and is now thought to have outlived Sancho. The supposed subsequent marriage of Sancho to a third wife, Philippa of Toulouse, that appeared in a later chronicle, is now thought to be erroneous.

Felicia gave birth to three sons, Ferdinand, Alfonso, and Ramiro. Alfonso I, and Ramiro II followed her step-son Peter I as rulers of the Kingdom of Aragon (Alfonso also in Navarre). Through her youngest son, Ramiro, his only daughter Petronila of Aragon, Felicia was the ancestor of the later rulers of Aragon.

References

|-

1123 deaths 
Aragonese queen consorts
1060s births
Year of birth uncertain
Burials at the Monastery of San Juan de la Peña
11th-century people from the Kingdom of Aragon
11th-century Spanish women
12th-century people from the Kingdom of Aragon
12th-century Spanish women
11th-century people from the Kingdom of Pamplona
12th-century nobility from the Kingdom of Navarre